is a Japanese professional footballer who plays as a defender for Oita Trinita.

References

External links

1996 births
Living people
Japanese footballers
Association football defenders
Kyoto Sanga FC players
Oita Trinita players
J2 League players
J1 League players